Christian Gavina (born January 27, 1979) is a Filipino professional basketball coach. He served as the head coach of the Taichung Suns in the T1 League.

Early life and college career 
Gavina was born in the Philippines and migrated to Jersey City, New Jersey when he was three years old. He played college basketball for the Stevens Institute of Technology in Hoboken, New Jersey. He finished second in all-time scoring for the school and have his jersey number retired after his graduation in 2001.

After graduation, he worked as a formulation chemist for L'Oreal from 2004 to 2008 and then moved back to the Philippines to pursue a career in basketball. He first played for the Quezon Red Oilers and the Mandaue-Cebu Landmasters of the defunct Liga Pilipinas.

Coaching career
After his contract expired with Mandaue, he returned to the United States and earned a strength and conditioning coach certification at the Institute of Sports and Science. He returned to Manila and got a job for ABL's AirAsia Philippine Patriots' as their strength and conditioning coach in 2011. When the Patriots were disbanded in 2012, he then moved to GlobalPort Batang Pier of the PBA.

In 2016, Gavina was named as the first assistant coach of Manny Pacquiao for the Mahindra Floodbuster, replacing Chito Victolero. Although Pacquiao is named as the head coach of the Floodbuster, Gavina ran the day-to-day practices and acted as the head coach in Pacquiao's absence.

After Pacquiao's contract as player-coach in Mahindra (later renamed as Kia Picanto in 2017) expired after the 2016–17 season, Gavina was named as the head coach of the Picanto.

On 2018, Gavina returned to PBA after being tapped as an assistant coach of the Rain or Shine Elasto Painters.

On October 25, 2022, Gavina signed with the Taichung Suns of the T1 League for head coach.

Coaching record

PBA

T1 League

References

1979 births
Living people
College men's basketball players in the United States
Filipino chemists
Filipino emigrants to the United States
Filipino men's basketball coaches
Filipino men's basketball players
Terrafirma Dyip coaches
Stevens Institute of Technology alumni
Rain or Shine Elasto Painters coaches
Taichung Suns head coaches
Filipino expatriate basketball people in Taiwan